The Ida Valley lies east of the  Manuherikia Valley in  Central Otago, New Zealand. The majority of agricultural production in the Ida Valley is lamb, including merino, and also stud cattle.  

The valley is named after the Idaburn.  Idaburn flows from Mount Ida in the Ida Range, through the northern section of the Ida Valley, breaks through Raggedy Ridge through the Poolburn Gorge and into Manuherikia River. The Idaburn is joined by the Pool Burn (which drains the southern section of the valley) shortly before entering the Poolburn Gorge.

The largest settlement in the sparsely populated Ida Valley is Oturehua, a small village at the northern end.  Other localities include "Moa Creek", "Poolburn", "Ida Valley" and "Idaburn" which are  groups of a few houses and farms rather than villages.  Poolburn is the location of the local full primary school.

The Ida Valley Omakau Road leads through much of the valley, starting at the locality Idaburn beside  State Highway 85 at the northern end, through Oturehua, the Ida Valley locality towards the centre, the Poolburn locality at the southern end and on to Omakau in the Manuherikia Valley, also on  State Highway 85.

Tourism

The valley has a rich gold mining heritage, with remnants of mines and workings on display in and around Oturehua.

The Otago Central Rail Trail leads through much of the Ida Valley from Idaburn through to the Poolburn Gorge, a scenic section of this cycle trail encompassing two viaducts as well as two tunnels.  Local operators provide bike hire and coach transport for day trips of varying length between Oturehua and Omakau.  Oturehua also provides accommodation options for multi-day bike trips on the rail trail.

The Power Of The Dog

Braeside, a 5500 hectare sheep and cattle farm in the Ida Valley, owned by brothers Al and Graeme McKnight and Philippa Pope, was used for the filming of the movie The Power of the Dog, which starred Benedict Cumberbatch, Kirsten Dunst, Jesse Plemons, Kodi Smit-McPhee and Keith Carradine.

Director Jane Campion chose the venue as the sparsely populated, grassy plains and rocky mountains of Central Otago matched Montana, where the movie was set.  Pre-production preparation included construction of a Western-style barn, homestead, cattle corral, cowboy quarters and saloon.   

The movie was nominated for twelve Academy Awards in 2022 and Jane Campion was awarded the Academy Award for Best Director,

References

Populated places in Otago
Valleys of Otago
Central Otago District